

Al Anbar

References
Source

2005 elections in Iraq
Election results in Iraq